Arcandra Tahar (born October 10, 1970) is an Indonesian politician. He was formerly Minister of Energy and Mineral Resources of the Republic of Indonesia on the Working Cabinet, replacing Sudirman Said who was dismissed by President Joko Widodo in a cabinet reshuffle on July 27, 2016.

Tahar was honourably discharged from said post on August 15, 2016, following allegations that he was a U.S. citizen, making him the minister with the shortest working period in Indonesian history (20 days). He was later appointed Deputy Minister of the same.

Early life 
Tahar was born on October 10, 1970 at Padang, West Sumatra, Indonesia, to Taharuddin and Zuraida. He is of Minangkabau descent and a Muslim.

Education 
Studying there from 1989-1994, Tahar obtained a Bachelor's of Science in Mechanical Engineering at the Bandung Institute of Technology, then went to work for Andersen Consulting. Subsequently, he enrolled at Texas A&M University in 1996 for his Master's of Science in Ocean Engineering, successfully graduating in 1998. He remained at A&M as a candidate for the Doctorate of Philosophy in Ocean Engineering, which he obtained in 2001.

Citizenship controversy 
Not long after being appointed as Minister, there was a rumour that Tahar had become a citizen of the United States in March 2012. Because Indonesia does not recognize dual nationality, this meant that Tahar would have lost his Indonesian nationality. However, according to Tahar, he entered Indonesia using an Indonesian passport valid until 2017.

On August 12, 2016, the U.S. embassy at Jakarta issued him with a Certificate of Loss of Nationality, which was endorsed by the Department of State on August 15, 2016 (his name appears on the Quarterly Publication of Individuals Who Have Chosen to Expatriate). This meant that Tahar had relinquished his U.S. citizenship. That same day, Tahar was removed by President Joko Widodo and replaced by Luhut Pandjaitan.

On August 30, 2016, the U.S. embassy wrote a letter on Tahar's behalf, confirming his loss of U.S. nationality. As Tahar was no longer a U.S. citizen, the Ministry of Justice and Human Rights under Yasonna Laoly ceased loss-of-nationality proceedings against him to prevent his statelessness, and granted him a certificate of retention of citizenship on September 1, 2016. This made him once again eligible for Indonesian government appointments.

Subsequent political career 
On October 14, 2016, Tahar was officially sworn in as Deputy Minister under Minister of Energy and Mineral Resources Ignasius Jonan.

References 

1970 births
Living people
People from West Sumatra
Indonesian Muslims
Working Cabinet (Joko Widodo)